Boycott Olympics may refer to:

Olympic boycotts, generally
African boycott of the 1976 Summer Olympics
1980 Summer Olympics boycott
1984 Summer Olympics boycott